Dhola may refer to the following places : 

 In Southern Asia 
 Dhola, Assam, northeastern India
 Dhola, Gujarat, western India
 Dhola State, a former princely state with capital in the above town
 Dhola, Nepal
 Dhola, Diamond Harbour, a village in South 24 Parganas, West Bengal, India

 Elsewhere
 Dhola, Iraq, a municipality in northern Iraq

See also 
 Dhola Maru, a romantic tale
 Dhola-Sadiya bridge, connecting the northeast Indian states of Assam and Arunachal Pradesh